Molly McCann (born 4 May 1990) is an English mixed martial artist. She is a former Cage Warriors Flyweight Champion and currently competes in the women's flyweight division of the Ultimate Fighting Championship (UFC).

Early life
McCann was born in Liverpool on 4 May 1990. Her father was absent and mother had substance abuse problems, so she was partially raised by her aunt. She grew up in Liverpool's Norris Green area with two sisters. Initially, she trained in karate, kickboxing, and Thai boxing before starting boxing around the age of 12. She then played football for five years before starting MMA training in 2013. Despite a life-long affinity with Everton, McCann played for Liverpool, until an ankle ligament injury brought about her football retirement. Upon signing 16-year-old McCann in 2006, Liverpool manager Keith "Cliffy" Cliffe described her as a promising midfielder who liked to push forward. She graduated from Liverpool John Moores University with a degree in sports development and physical education.

Mixed martial arts career

Early career
McCann fought most of her early MMA career in Liverpool. In her early years as a fighter, she supported herself by working at Subway, which earned her the nickname "Meatball Molly". She fought for the MMA promotion Shock N' Awe, where she won the vacant Shock N' Awe Flyweight Championship and also defended it once. McCann also won the vacant Cage Warriors Fighting Championship Women's Flyweight Championship in 2018 against Bryony Tyrell. After competing on the regional circuit, she amassed a record of 7–1 before signing with the UFC.

Ultimate Fighting Championship
McCann made her UFC debut on 27 May 2018, against Gillian Robertson at UFC Fight Night: Thompson vs. Till. At the weigh-ins, she weighed in at 127 pounds, a single pound over the flyweight non-title fight limit of 126. She was fined 20% of her purse, which went to Robertson. She lost the fight via a rear-naked choke in round two.

Her second fight came on 15 March 2019, facing Priscila Cachoeira at UFC Fight Night: Till vs. Masvidal. She won the fight via unanimous decision.

McCann faced Ariane Lipski on 22 June 2019 at UFC Fight Night: Moicano vs. Korean Zombie. She won the fight via unanimous decision. Shortly after the fight, McCann signed a new four-fight contract with the UFC.

McCann faced Diana Belbiţă on 18 October 2019 at UFC on ESPN 6. She won the fight via unanimous decision.

McCann was scheduled to face Ashlee Evans-Smith on 21 March 2020 at UFC Fight Night: Woodley vs. Edwards. Due to the COVID-19 pandemic, the event was eventually postponed. Instead, McCann faced Taila Santos on 16 July 2020 at UFC on ESPN: Kattar vs. Ige. She lost the fight via unanimous decision.

McCann faced Lara Procópio on 6 February 2021 at UFC Fight Night: Overeem vs. Volkov. She lost the fight via unanimous decision.

McCann faced Ji Yeon Kim on 4 September 2021 at UFC Fight Night 191. She won the fight via unanimous decision. The back-and-forth bout won both contestants the Fight of the Night bonus award.

McCann faced Luana Carolina on 19 March 2022 at UFC Fight Night 204. She won the fight via knockout after landing a "Hellbow" - or spinning back elbow - in round three. With this win, she received the Performance of the Night award.

McCann faced Hannah Goldy on 23 July 2022 at UFC Fight Night 208. She won the fight via technical knockout. This win earned her the Performance of the Night award.

As the first bout of her new eight-fight contract, McCann faced Erin Blanchfield on 12 November 2022 at UFC 281. She lost the fight via a kimura submission in the first round. During the fight, McCann only landed 7 strikes in contrast to the 93 strikes landed by Blanchfield.

Personal life
McCann struggled with her sexuality in her youth. She came out publicly as lesbian at 25 after stating, "I absolutely ran from it until the wheels fell off, until I couldn't run no more."

McCann is a close friend of fellow Liverpudlian mixed martial artist Paddy Pimblett and a supporter of Everton and Celtic. She describes herself as a socialist and a Labour supporter. She is an opponent of the Conservative Party, due to her opinion that they had a negative effect on Liverpool and the working class in general, and on 23 July 2022, she led the crowd at the O2 Arena in a chant of "fuck the tories".

McCann and Irish boxer Katie Taylor are cousins. Three of her grandparents are from Ireland.

Championships and accomplishments

Mixed martial arts
 Ultimate Fighting Championship
 Fight of the Night (One time) 
 Performance of the Night (Two times) 
Cage Warriors Fighting Championship
Cage Warriors Fighting Championship Women's Flyweight Champion (One time)
MMAjunkie.com
2022 March Knockout of the Month

Mixed martial arts record

|-
|Loss
|align=center|13–5
|Erin Blanchfield
|Submission (kimura)
|UFC 281
|
|align=center|1
|align=center|3:37
|New York City, New York, United States
|
|-
|Win
|align=center|13–4
|Hannah Goldy
|TKO (spinning back elbow and punches)
|UFC Fight Night: Blaydes vs. Aspinall
|
|align=center|1
|align=center|3:52
|London, England
|
|-
|Win
|align=center|12–4
|Luana Carolina
|KO (spinning back elbow)
|UFC Fight Night: Volkov vs. Aspinall
|
|align=center|3
|align=center|1:52
|London, England
|
|-
|Win
|align=center|11–4
|Ji Yeon Kim
|Decision (unanimous)
|UFC Fight Night: Brunson vs. Till
|
|align=center|3
|align=center|5:00
|Las Vegas, Nevada, United States
|
|-
|Loss
|align=center|10–4
|Lara Procópio
|Decision (unanimous)
|UFC Fight Night: Overeem vs. Volkov
|
|align=center|3
|align=center|5:00
|Las Vegas, Nevada, United States
|
|-
|Loss
|align=center|10–3
|Taila Santos
|Decision (unanimous)
|UFC on ESPN: Kattar vs. Ige
|
|align=center|3
|align=center|5:00
|Abu Dhabi, United Arab Emirates
|
|-
|Win
|align=center|10–2
|Diana Belbiţă
|Decision (unanimous)
|UFC on ESPN: Reyes vs. Weidman
|
|align=center|3
|align=center|5:00
|Boston, Massachusetts, United States
|
|-
|Win
|align=center|9–2
|Ariane Lipski
|Decision (unanimous)
|UFC Fight Night: Moicano vs. The Korean Zombie
|
|align=center|3
|align=center|5:00
|Greenville, South Carolina, United States
|
|-
|Win
|align=center|8–2
|Priscila Cachoeira
|Decision (unanimous)
|UFC Fight Night: Till vs. Masvidal
|
|align=center|3
|align=center|5:00
|London, England
|
|-
|Loss
|align=center|7–2
|Gillian Robertson
|Technical Submission (rear-naked choke)
|UFC Fight Night: Thompson vs. Till
|
|align=center|2
|align=center|2:05
|Liverpool, England
|
|-
|Win
|align=center|7–1
|Bryony Tyrell
|TKO (punches)
|Cage Warriors 90
|
|align=center|2
|align=center|1:32
|Liverpool, England
|
|-
|Win
|align=center|6–1
|Priscila de Souza
|Decision (unanimous)
|Cage Warriors Fighting Championship 88
|
|align=center|3
|align=center|5:00
|Liverpool, England
|
|-
|Win
|align=center|5–1
|Lacey Schuckman
|Decision (unanimous)
|Cage Warriors Fighting Championship 82
|
|align=center|3
|align=center|5:00
|Liverpool, England
|
|-
|Win
|align=center|4–1
|Anjela Pink
|TKO (knees to the body and punches)
|Shinobi War 9
|
|align=center|1
|align=center|0:50
|Liverpool, England
|
|-
|Win
|align=center|3–1
|Macicilia Benkhettache
|TKO (punches)
|Shock N' Awe 23
|
|align=center|2
|align=center|1:15
|Portsmouth, England
|
|-
|Win
|align=center|2–1
|Valérie Domergue
|Decision (split)
|Shock N' Awe 22
|
|align=center|3
|align=center|5:00
|Portsmouth, England
|
|-
|Loss
|align=center|1–1
|Vanessa Melo
|Decision (unanimous)
|XFC International 12
|
|align=center|3
|align=center|5:00
|São Paulo, Brazil
|
|-
|Win
|align=center|1–0
|Katy Horlick
|TKO (punches)
|Shock N' Awe 20
|
|align=center|1
|align=center|3:12
|Portsmouth, England
|
|-

See also
 List of current UFC fighters
 List of female mixed martial artists

Books
Molly Meatball McCann - Be True To You: A story about coming out, Self-published (30 June 2021),

References

External links
 
 

1990 births
Living people
Barstool Sports people
English female mixed martial artists
English people of Irish descent
Flyweight mixed martial artists
Mixed martial artists utilizing boxing
Mixed martial artists utilizing Brazilian jiu-jitsu
Martial artists from Liverpool
LGBT mixed martial artists
English practitioners of Brazilian jiu-jitsu
Female Brazilian jiu-jitsu practitioners
Alumni of Liverpool John Moores University
Ultimate Fighting Championship female fighters
People from Norris Green
English LGBT sportspeople
FA Women's National League players
Liverpool F.C. Women players
English women's footballers
Women's association footballers not categorized by position